"White & Nerdy" is the second single from "Weird Al" Yankovic's album Straight Outta Lynwood, which was released on September 26, 2006. It parodies the song "Ridin'" by Chamillionaire and Krayzie Bone. The song both satirizes and celebrates nerd culture, as recited by the subject, who cannot "roll with the gangstas" because he is "just too white and nerdy". It includes many references to activities stereotypically associated with nerds and white people, such as collecting comic books and action figures, editing Wikipedia and playing Dungeons & Dragons (D&D).

The song was Yankovic's first and only Billboard Hot 100 top 10 hit, peaking at No. 9. It was certified platinum by the RIAA, the first Yankovic single to achieve this feat.

Track listing
 "White & Nerdy" – 2:50
 "Don't Download This Song" – 3:54

Production and writing
Although Yankovic usually records his songs with his band, the backing tracks for "White and Nerdy" were recorded by guitarist Jim West—who handled the synthesizer production—and Jon "Bermuda" Schwartz—who recorded the drums. The backing musicians recorded their respective tracks at their home studios. Yankovic added his rap vocals later at Westlake Studio in Los Angeles, California.

Music video
The single has an accompanying music video, which was recorded in high definition. The video, loosely parodying the video for Chamillionaire's "Ridin'" and following the song's lyrics, shows Yankovic, dressed as a stereotypical nerd with a buttoned-up polo shirt, dress slacks, and horn-rimmed glasses attempting to fit in with the "gangsters" (Keegan-Michael Key and Jordan Peele of MADtv), but instead either scaring them away, causing them to flip him off, or to direct him away from their group and instead towards a herd of other "nerds". These scenes include shots that directly parody the "Ridin'" video, including similar outfits by both artists. Yankovic is seen at night dancing in front of a set of road flares arranged in the form of Pac-Man, similar to the shot of Chamillionaire in front of the figure of a lizard, his personal logo. Another repeated scene shows Yankovic along with Donny Osmond—the "whitest guy I could think of", according to Yankovic—dancing in front of the Schrödinger equation, mimicking shots of Chamillionaire and Krayzie Bone from the "Ridin'" video. Yankovic had found Osmond to be eager to be in the video, having memorized the song before recording as well as having his various moves already figured out before filming.

Further interspersed among these shots are additional shots of Yankovic demonstrating his "white and nerdy" life. One scene shows Yankovic vandalizing the Wikipedia page for Atlantic Records, replacing it with the words (in excessively large type) "YOU SUCK!", referencing his recent trouble with the company in getting permission to release "You're Pitiful", a parody of James Blunt's song "You're Beautiful". Fans of the video have replicated the action depicted in the video several times. The video shows a fictional Trivial Pursuit card, with questions that include the location of the largest ball of twine (a reference to his song "The Biggest Ball of Twine in Minnesota)", on what page Harry Potter would die in the next book, and the number of Wicket men there are on a 43-Man Squamish team.

The video includes other cameos. The Impala's "OG4LIFE" license plate refers to Ice-T's 1991 album Original Gangster. Seth Green, whom Yankovic had known for some time, appears in front of a wall display of action figures. Green also provided a number of the props for the video. Judy Tenuta, a regular on The Weird Al Show who also previously appeared in "Headline News", plays the woman who receives a surge protector as a present. Other actors were recruited by Yankovic through his MySpace page, from which he received extras who said they would appear for free. The video's comic book store is Golden Apple Comics in Los Angeles, California.

The video was leaked onto YouTube on September 17, 2006, one day before the planned official release date on AOL. Due to the leak, the premiere was canceled, and AOL silently slipped the video onto their website. VH1 started airing the video in "large rotation" on September 20, 2006; the video debuted at #5 on their Top 20 countdown.

Fan-made video 
Yahoo! Music solicited online members to make a fans-only video for "White & Nerdy". The video was released in late 2006.

Live performances
On November 2, 2006, Yankovic performed "White & Nerdy" live on The Tonight Show with Jay Leno. (He rode a Segway as he came on stage.) It was his first public live performance of the song; various background vocals from the original recording are played to allow him time to breathe during the fast-paced lyrics. Since then, however, his band has provided live background vocals. On December 3, he performed the song live at the VH1 "Big In '06" Awards. Since 2007, Yankovic has performed the song on each of his tours, entering the stage on a Segway and wearing his hoodie and bandana from the video rather than using his "nerd" look. His band members maintain the "nerdy" outfits.

Awards and accolades
The song became Yankovic's first career Top 10 hit on the Billboard Hot 100, a record 23 years after his first appearance on the Hot 100 chart with "Ricky" in 1983. It debuted at #28 on the Hot 100 (that week's "Hot Shot Debut"), and peaked at #9 the following week, beating his previous #12 peak for 1984's "Eat It". It spent a total of 20 weeks on the Hot 100, including 5 weeks in the Top 20 and 10 weeks in the Top 40. This was also his first Top 40 single since 1992's "Smells Like Nirvana". It peaked on the Hot Digital Songs chart at #5. Both the song and the music video reached #1 at the U.S. and Australian iTunes Store, and peaked at #1 on VH1's top 20 video countdown. Both "White & Nerdy" and Straight Outta Lynwood were certified gold, and later platinum, by the RIAA. This marks the first time any one of Yankovic's singles has been certified platinum.

Reaction from Chamillionaire

Chamillionaire placed "White & Nerdy" on his MySpace page, commenting that he enjoyed the parody. In an interview, Chamillionaire complimented Yankovic's rapping ability, saying, "He's actually rapping pretty good on it, it's crazy ... I didn't know he could rap like that." Yankovic stated that Chamillionaire approached him on the red carpet after "Ridin'" won the Grammy award for Best Rap Song at the 49th Annual Grammy Awards and said that the parody "made it undeniable that ["Ridin'"] was the rap song of the year".

Chart positions

Weekly

Year-end

Certifications

See also

List of singles by "Weird Al" Yankovic
List of songs by "Weird Al" Yankovic
"It's All About the Pentiums" – a song with a similar topic, also by Yankovic
Wikipedia in popular culture

References

External links
Official e-card for the song, includes quiz and video (archive).
 Music video 
 YouTube

2006 singles
"Weird Al" Yankovic songs
Music videos directed by "Weird Al" Yankovic
Songs with lyrics by "Weird Al" Yankovic
Songs about white people
Nerdcore songs
Nerd culture
Comedy rap songs
Cultural depictions of Stephen Hawking
Satirical songs
Volcano Entertainment singles
American hip hop songs
2006 songs